The Volkswagen Typ 87, also known as the Kommandeurswagen, is a World War II, four-wheel-drive version of the Volkswagen Beetle. It was produced from 1941 to 1944 by the Volkswagen plant, primarily for high officers of the Wehrmacht (German armed forces). The Wehrmacht classified the Kommandeurswagen as leichter geländegängiger PKW, 4-sitziger, 4-radgetriebener Geländewagen Typ 87. ("light offroad passenger car, four seat, four-wheel drive offroad vehicle Type 87").

The engine and drive-train, including portal geared wheel hubs, are the same as in the Volkswagen Typ 166 Schwimmwagen amphibious vehicle. 564 units of the Kommandeurswagen were produced; in November 1946, the Volkswagen plant - by then under British control -  produced two more vehicles using spare parts from stores.

Description 
The Typ 87 is a two-door offroad saloon. The visual appearance is similar to the KdF-Wagen, because the KdF-Wagen body was also used for the Typ 87. Due to the 5¼-16 offroad tyres, the wings had to be increased in width. The running boards were also made wider. While the boot of the KdF-Wagen holds a spare wheel in front of the fuel tank, the Typ 87 has an additional  fuel canister instead at the same place. The spare wheel is located on top of the  fuel tank, which has a modified filler neck. Chassis and body are connected with screws. By default, the Kommandeurswagen has a sunroof.

Like the VW Typ 166, the Typ 87 has a modified KdF-Wagen chassis. The backbone tube was increased in diameter to hold the additional drive shaft for the front wheels. A worm and sector steering was used, and the steering knuckles were modified to fit driveshafts for the front-wheel drive. The rear axle is equipped with reduction gears, both front and rear axle differentials are lockable. A single disc Fichtel & Sachs K10 dry clutch transmits the torque from the engine to the manual Porsche four-speed (plus reverse) gearbox, which is equipped with an additional offroad gear. The lever that engaged the offroad gear also engaged the front wheel drive.

The Typ 87 is powered by an air-cooled flat four-cylinder  four-stroke OHV petrol engine fed by a single Solex 26 VF3 carburettor.

Vehicles made for the German Afrika Korps were often equipped with tropical equipment which protected the air filter, the carburettor and the electrics from dust; in addition to that, they were fitted with Kronprinz sand tyres.

Technical specifications

References

Bibliography 

 Hans-Georg Mayer: Der VW-Käfer im Kriege und im militärischen Einsatz danach. Band 114 aus der Reihe Waffen-Arsenal, Podzun-Pallas-Verlag, Dorheim 1988, . 

World War II vehicles of Germany
Kübelwagen
Rear-engined vehicles
Cars powered by boxer engines
Military light utility vehicles
Military vehicles introduced from 1940 to 1944
Military vehicles of Germany